Psalm 151 is a short psalm found in most copies of the Septuagint (LXX), but not in the Masoretic Text of the Hebrew Bible. The title given to this psalm in the Septuagint indicates that it is supernumerary, as no number is affixed to it. The psalm is ascribed to David. It is also included in some manuscripts of the Peshitta. The psalm concerns the story of David and Goliath.

The Eastern Orthodox, Coptic Orthodox, Armenian Apostolic, and Syrian Orthodox churches accept Psalm 151 as canonical. Catholics, Protestants, and most Jews consider it apocryphal. However, it is found in some Catholic Bibles, such as certain editions of the Latin Vulgate, as well as in some ecumenical translations, such as the Revised Standard Version. Athanasius of Alexandria mentions this psalm as being "especially the Psalm of David," and as being suited to occasions in which, "weak as you are, you people are chosen for some position of authority among the brethren."

Text
The title of the psalm states that it was written by David after his battle with Goliath. The psalm assumes familiarity with other Biblical passages, from which it draws phraseology.
1 I was small among my brothers,
    and the youngest in my father’s house;
I tended my father’s sheep.
2 My hands made a harp;
    my fingers fashioned a lyre.
3 And who will tell my Lord?
    The Lord Himself; it is He who hears.
4 It was he who sent His messenger
    and took me from my father’s sheep,
    and anointed me with his anointing oil.
5 My brothers were handsome and tall,
    But the Lord was not pleased with them.
6 I went out to meet the Philistine,
    and he cursed me by his idols.
7 But I drew his own sword;
    I beheaded him, and took away disgrace from the people of Israel..

The Psalm 151 is preserved in Hebrew, Greek (LXX), and Syriac.

Dead Sea Scrolls discovery

For many years scholars believed that Psalm 151 was originally composed in Greek, based on the view that "there is no evidence that Psalm 151 ever existed in Hebrew."

However, Psalm 151 appears along with several canonical and non-canonical psalms in the scroll known as "The Great Psalms Scroll" or "11Q5," a scroll, dating from the 1st century, that was discovered in 1956. The editio princeps of this manuscript was first published in 1963 by James A. Sanders. This scroll contains two short Hebrew psalms which scholars now agree served as the basis for Psalm 151.

A Hebrew psalm known as “Psalm 151a” provides the source material for verses 1–5 of the Greek Psalm 151, while the remaining verses are derived from another Hebrew psalm, known as “Psalm 151b,” which is only partially preserved. The composer of the Greek Psalm apparently brought the two Hebrew psalms together in a manner that significantly changes their meaning and structure, but the influence of the Hebrew originals is still readily apparent. Where parts of the Greek version sometimes seem to make little sense or are ambiguous, the Hebrew text sheds light on the intended message or meaning. In comparison to the Hebrew text, Sanders regards the Greek text of this psalm to be in places “desiccated,” “meaningless,” “truncated,” “absurd,” “jumbled,” and “disappointingly different,” all as a result of its having been “made from a truncated amalgamation of the two Hebrew psalms.” On details of translation, structure, and meaning of this psalm, see also the works of Skehan, Brownlee, Carmignac, John Strugnell, Rabinowitz, Dupont-Sommer, and Flint.

Liturgical usage

Armenian liturgy 
In the Armenian Church, Psalm 151 is recited as part of the Matins sequence of biblical poetic material, which includes canticles from the Old and New Testaments, Psalms 51, 148–150, and 113 (numbering according to the Septuagint). The Armenian version of Psalm 151 is close to the Septuagint, with some variation. Where verse 2 in Greek reads αἱ χεῖρές μου ἐποίησαν ὄργανον οἱ δάκτυλοί μου ἤροσαν ψαλτήριον "My hands made an instrument, my fingers fashioned the lyre," the Armenian has, Ձերք իմ արարին զսաղմոսարանս եւ մատունք իմ կազմեցին զգործի աւրհնութեան "My hands made the lyres (Armenian զսաղմոսարանս can then means also 'Psalm-books' 'psalters') and my fingers fashioned the instrument of blessing."

Coptic liturgy 
In the Coptic Church, Psalm 151 is recited at the start of the Bright Saturday Vigil, also known as the Apocalypse Vigil. The words of the psalm are interpreted as a Messianic prophecy concerning Christ's defeat of Satan.

English versions
Besides being available in Orthodox or ecumenical editions of modern translations since 1977 (Revised Standard Version, New Revised Standard Version, English Standard Version, Orthodox Study Bible, Contemporary English Version, Common English Bible), there are a number of English translations now in the public domain. William Whiston included it in his Authentic Records. It can be found in translations by Charles Thomson to Lancelot Charles Lee Brenton, and in Adam Clarke's commentary. It is included in Sabine Baring-Gould's Legends of the Patriarchs and Prophets, William Digby Seymour's Hebrew Psalter, and William Ralph Churton's Uncanonical and Apocryphal Scriptures. William Wright published a translation of the Syriac version in the Proceedings of the Society of Biblical Archaeology, June 1887, and A. A. Brockway published a translation from the Coptic in the January 27, 1898 New York Times.

Cultural influence
At the beginning of his first address to his Council of State, Emperor Haile Selassie of Ethiopia recited this psalm in full.

Other references to Psalm 151

The term "Psalm 151" has been used in other contexts, including modern popular culture. In these instances, the term does not refer to the supernumerary psalm included in the Orthodox canon, but instead as a metaphor (such as to the abstract concept of a new and "sacred" work of poetry or song).

 The TV show Touched by an Angel, Season 5, Episode 9 (originally aired 15 November 1998) is titled "Psalm 151" with a song sung by Wynonna Judd called "Testify to Love". In the episode, she composes the song for her dying son.

 In 1993, Péter Eötvös composed "Psalm 151 – In Memoriam Frank Zappa" for solo or four percussionists.

 Christian rock band Jacob's Trouble wrapped up their 1989 Door into Summer LP with track 11, "Psalm 151."

 Rock artist Ezra Furman included a self-penned song entitled "Psalm 151" on her 2018 LP Transangelic Exodus; she later admitted she was unaware of Psalm 151's existence.

 The song "My Favorite Mutiny" from the album Pick a Bigger Weapon by The Coup (ft. Talib Kweli and Black Thought) contains the lyric "Tryin' to find Psalm number 151."

 Hip-hop artist Jay-Z uses "Psalm 151" as a metaphor in the 2022 song "God Did" by DJ Khaled.

See also
 Psalms
 Deuterocanonical books in Orthodox Christianity

References

Citations

Works cited

External links

Psalm 151 NRSV
Psalm 151 NET Bible
Psalm 151 Text in English at Athanasius.com
Psalm 151 English text from St Takla Coptic Church
Psalm 151 Arabic text, also from St Takla
 Psalm 151: 2013 Critical Translation with Audio Drama at biblicalaudio

Anagignoskomena
Dead Sea Scrolls
Psalms
Texts in the Septuagint
Works attributed to David
Jewish apocrypha